Silvio Lega (4 February 1945 – 24 April 2021) was an Italian politician from the Christian Democracy party who served as member of the Chamber of Deputies from 1983 to 1994.

Lega died from COVID-19 at the age of 76 in 2021.

References

1945 births
2021 deaths
21st-century Italian politicians
Deaths from the COVID-19 pandemic in Tuscany
Deputies of Legislature IX of Italy
Deputies of Legislature X of Italy
Senators of Legislature XI of Italy
Christian Democracy (Italy) members of the Chamber of Deputies (Italy)